The 1997–98 Taça de Portugal was the 58th edition of the Portuguese football knockout tournament, organized by the Portuguese Football Federation (FPF). The 1997–98 Taça de Portugal began in September 1997. The final was played on 24 May 1998 at the Estádio Nacional.

Boavista were the previous holders, having defeated Benfica 3–2 in the previous season's final. Defending champions Boavista were eliminated in the quarter finals by second division side União de Leiria. Porto defeated Braga, 3–1 in the final to win their ninth Taça de Portugal. As a result of Porto winning both the league and cup in the same season, cup finalists Braga would play the Dragões in the 1998 Supertaça Cândido de Oliveira.

Fifth round
Ties were played on the 16 November–17 December, whilst replays were played between the 3–28 December.

Sixth round
Ties were played between the 28 December to the 14 January. Due to the odd number of teams involved at this stage of the competition, União de Leiria qualified for the quarter-finals due to having no opponent to face at this stage of the competition.

Quarter-finals
Ties were played on the 4 February, whilst replays were played between the 11–17 February.

Semi-finals
Ties were played on the 24 February.

Final

References

Taça de Portugal seasons
Taca De Portugal, 1997-98
1997–98 domestic association football cups